Port Tunnel may refer to:

Dublin Port Tunnel, a tunnel in Ireland
Port of Miami Tunnel, also referred to as the Miami Port Tunnel, an under construction tunnel in Florida